Battle Abbey School is a private coeducational day and boarding school in the small town of Battle, East Sussex, England. The senior school occupies part of the town's ruined abbey complex, and it is from here that the school derives its name. Originally formed as St. Etheldreda's, in 1989 Glengorse and Hydneye was merged into the school.

History
The abbey was initially constructed at the behest of the Norman invader William the Conqueror to commemorate his victory at the site over the Anglo-Saxon King of England, Harold Godwinson in 1066. Subsequently, the abbey was partially destroyed during the dissolution of the Monasteries under King Henry VIII. During this period some of the abbey buildings were destroyed. The 13th-century Abbot’s house was preserved and passed into private hands, and numerous additional structures also survived including the 14th-century gatehouse (which now serves as the main school gate) as well as a ruined monks' dorter (dormitory).

The school was founded in 1912, as St. Etheldreda's, Bexhill, by May Jacoby and her sister Helen Sheehan-Dare. It moved into the Abbey in 1922, with an enrolment of 33 girls. Within a year there were 100 girls and the Board of Education officially recognised the school in 1926. The Abbot's house now forms the centrepiece of the senior school, with the preparatory school and nursery situated in the nearby town of Bexhill-on-Sea.

Notable alumni
Georgina Henry, journalist
Clare Torry, singer
Dan Poulter, Conservative Member of Parliament for Central Suffolk and North Ipswich (2010– )

References

External links
School Website
Profile on the Independent Schools Council website

Educational institutions established in 1922
Private schools in East Sussex
Boarding schools in East Sussex
Rother District
Battle, East Sussex
1922 establishments in England